Dan Clews is the debut solo album from English folk singer-songwriter Dan Clews, released on 15 December 2009.

Track listing

References

2009 debut albums
Albums produced by Giles Martin